40th Division or 40th Infantry Division may refer to:

 Infantry Divisions 

 40th Division (German Empire), a unit of the Imperial German Army
 40th Division (Imperial Japanese Army), a unit of the Imperial Japanese Army
 40th Division (United Kingdom), a unit of the United Kingdom Army
 40th Infantry Division (United States), a unit of the California Army National Guard in the U.S. Army.
 40th Infantry Division (People's Republic of China), a unit of the PLA
 40th Rifle Division
 40th Infantry Division Cacciatori d'Africa, Italian division of World War II

 Aviation Divisions 
 40th Air Division, a unit of the United States Air Force

See also
 40th Brigade (disambiguation)
 40th Regiment (disambiguation)
 40th Battalion (disambiguation)
 40th Squadron (disambiguation)